Sustainable film production is the concept of film production with particular concern for environmental, economic, and social issues. Sustainability in film production incorporates socially and environmentally responsible decision making into the pre-production and production of the film. It involves sustainable development principles at all levels of filmmaking and is best accomplished in a unified manner with collaboration and cooperation from all departments and/or participants in making the film. The sustainability of the film production should start at the launch of the project, and involve all of the key stakeholders including the director, film producer, production or costume designer, cast, and crew.

Film production can be sustainable by working with the triple bottom line of environmental, social, and economic factors. Environmentally, for example, by reducing carbon emissions produced by travel arrangements; selecting vehicles with less CO2 emissions, improved route planning, carpooling or adopting a more sustainable means of transport can help reduce the environmental footprint. Socially, by establishing clear guidelines for minimizing the impact of the filming schedule on local communities (one way this can be achieved by limiting hours of work and engaging early with communities about the logistical effects on the area) and by integrating social enterprising suppliers in the production's supply chain. Economically, the film production can be intentional about helping communities’ benefit from film activities: for example, by employing local residents and paying them appropriately or utilizing local props, extras and catering.

History

The discussion of sustainability in film began in the early 1990s, as reported in The Hollywood Reporter and Variety. However, the attention was demonstrated in environmental content, environmental activism, and the philanthropy of celebrities rather than the production operations.

In Canada, British Columbia formalized their sustainable production efforts in 2006 through the Reel Green initiative, a "resource centre with a collection of best practices to help productions reduce their environmental impacts and improve their overall environmental footprint". Following those initiatives in Canada, vendors such as Green Spark Group (2014) and Keep it Green Recycling (2017) have emerged to help productions with recycling and greenhouse gas accounting.

In the UK, the British Standard 8909 was announced at the Cannes Film Festival in 2011 to improve the British film industry's environmental, social, and economic impact after seeing how BS8901 helped the British events sector.

Globally, many film studios have adopted sustainability initiatives, including the "Big Five": Universal Pictures, Walt Disney Pictures, Warner Bros., Columbia Pictures, and Paramount Pictures. As well as large television production studios like CBS.

The global dedication to sustainable production by the industry has cultivated in the Sustainable Production Forum annually in Vancouver to gather for collaboration and dedication on sustainable film production. Topics discussed at the forum have included fleet transport in the film industry, compostable plastics and packaging, diversity in film, and the future of energy.

Awards for Sustainable Production

The Environmental Media Association (EMA) has a "Green Seal" for various categories, one of which being production. The EMA Green Seal recognizes programs honoring progress in sustainable production. The score for production practices is evaluated on a scale of 200 points, with 75 points being the lowest threshold to receive the Green Seal and 125 needed to receive the Gold Seal label. Evaluations are made on best practices in categories such as: production, accounting, art, assistant directors, camera, catering, construction, costume & wardrobe, craft service, electric, greens, grip, hair, locations, make-up, props, set decoration, special effects, sound, and transportation.

The Sustainable Production Forum gives away two awards annually: Sustainable Production Impact and Sustainable Production Champion. The Sustainable Production Impact Award recognizes productions that "have had measurable reduction in greenhouse gas emissions and/or waste diversion and contributed positively to the local community". The Sustainable Production Champion award recognizes individuals that "go above and beyond to advance sustainable production in the motion picture industry".

Events featuring Sustainable Production

Sustainable Production Forum

The Sustainable Production Forum is the first and only forum to bring together leaders of the film industry to discuss sustainable practices in production, rather than simply environmental friendly content. The Sustainable Production Forum was launched in 2016. It gives one type of award for recognized sustainable production champions (individuals) and one type of award for impacts (productions).

Notable events that recognize environmental content are the EMA Awards and this list of environmental film festivals.

Examples of Sustainable Film Production

The X-Files

The X-Files Season 10 reboot diverted more than 81% of its total waste from landfills. In addition, 100% of the aluminum and steel used in set construction was recycled. A total of 33 tons of  emissions were avoided, as well as 45,740 plastic bottles. The switch from bottles to jugs alone saved production by $35,000.

Fifty Shades Freed

Fifty Shades Freed is the third movie in the "Fifty Shades" phenomenon. The film was filmed mainly in Vancouver, BC and the production worked hard to reduce their footprint. To begin, Fifty Shades Freed was shot consecutively with its predecessor Fifty Shades Darker which helped the production combine and reuse materials. Also, the crew eliminated plastic bottles and saved about 80,000 single use bottles. The set contained a comprehensive recycling and composing program, and had a dedicated Sustainability Production Assistant to take the point on that initiative which resulted in 75% of waste diverted from landfills. Set dressing and materials were donated to Habitat for Humanity ReStore, Great Northern Way Scene Shop, MakerLabs, and Squamish Arts Council at wrap. The Universal Pictures’ Assets Department worked with the Sustainable Lock Up in Vancouver and Recycled Movie Sets in Los Angeles to recirculate the stored sets from the trilogy for reuse and donation to local film schools, non-profits, and other productions. In total, 288 tons of set materials were donated to be reused and 99% of the trilogy's sets were kept out of landfills. Fifty Shades Freed was a recipient of a 2016 EMA Green Seal Award.

Downton Abbey

When filming in the United Kingdom, the Downton Abbey film's production team did a number of things to reduce their footprint including sending call sheets, scripts, and production documents electronically, no disposable food service products on site, and recycling/composting. In addition, Carnival Films stored sets from the six seasons of the television series Downton Abbey that production was able to re-use or re-purpose to save the consumption of new materials. Disposables were also saved by issuing the crew reusable water bottles and the sound department used reusable batteries. At the conclusion of production, the costume department donated $800 worth of fabric and materials to the Wimbledon College of Arts. Storage boxes and hangers were donated to local sewing and flower shops and set decoration donated produce to The Hounslow Urban Farm to be used to feed animals. Downton Abbey received a 2019 EMA Green Seal.

Yesterday

Yesterday implemented a strict-no idling policy to reduce CO2 emissions and many of the crew utilized public transportation. In addition to the sustainable practices, the set decoration team incorporated green messaging on the posters on the school set. The Yesterday team donated 2,860lbs of excess catering and set decoration to City Harvest London, feeding 2,383 in need. The construction department donated $6,000 worth of leather tapestries to a firefighting charity.  Costumes and props were donated to Dress for Success and British Heart Foundation. Yesterday received a 2019 EMA Gold Seal.

Environmental Production Guides

Green Production Guide

The Green Production Guide was developed by the Producers Guild of America Foundation and PGAGreen.org with primary support from NBCUniversal, ViacomCBS, Amblin Partners, Sony Pictures Entertainment, HBO, Netflix, Amazon Studios, Disney, WarnerMedia, 20th Century Studios, CBS & Participant Media.

The Green Production Guide includes a comprehensive database of vendors including info about their services, experience, and locations. The website additionally offers a Production Environmental Accounting Report (PEAR) that can be downloaded to aid production in analyzing their carbon footprint and the Production Environmental Actions Checklist (PEACH), which clarifies best practices in the industry.

Reel Green

Reel Green offers free carbon footprint literacy courses to members of the motion picture industry. The 6-hour workshops leave participants with knowledge on how to "have a sound understanding of the science of climate change, understand how to act to reduce their impact, recognize the impact that production has on the environment, and have knowledge of the tools and techniques to lessen this impact".

Universal Filmed Entertainment Group recently launched their new initiative titled the "GreenerLight Program," which is designed to embed sustainable practices throughout the entire filmmaking process. It will also examine the content and behaviors onscreen through an environmentally friendly lens. All films will include a sustainability plan, and will continue focus on areas such as energy efficiency, fuel-use reduction and donations of food and set material.

See Also

References

Corbett, Charles J, and Richard P Turco. Sustainability in the Motion Picture Industry. UCLA Institute of the Environment, 2006, Sustainability in the Motion Picture Industry, www.ioes.ucla.edu/wp-content/uploads/mpisreport.pdf.

References

Film production
Sustainability